The Bietigheim Horse Market is a well-known supra-regional Volksfest (beer festival and travelling funfair) in Bietigheim-Bissingen which takes place directly under the Bietigheim Enz Valley Bridge. It attracts several hundred thousand visitors every year. Despite this large crowd of visitors, however, the festival has retained the charm of a local festival.

The Bietigheim Horse Market begins on the Friday before the first Monday in September and ends the following Tuesday. Besides the traditional horse market on Monday, a riding and horse-jumping tournament is held from Friday until Sunday, and other riding demonstrations and a procession and subsequent concours d'elegance on the Monday. There is also an entertainment park with marquees, and a large market and fireworks after nightfall on the Sunday. When the funfair on the festival site includes a Ferris wheel, it offers the rare opportunity to photograph trains on the Bietigheim Enz Valley Bridge from an unusual perspective.

External links 

 Infos auf der Homepage der Stadt Bietigheim-Bissingen
 Reiterverein Bietigheim-Bissingen e.V.

Beer festivals in Germany
Ludwigsburg (district)
Annual events in Germany
Autumn events in Germany